Jalan Parit Sulong–Tongkang Pechah (Johor state route J126) is a major road in Johor, Malaysia

List of interchanges

Roads in Johor